Storage device may refer to:

 Box, or any of a variety of containers or receptacles.
 Data storage device, a device for recording information, which could range from handwriting to video or acoustic recording, or to electromagnetic energy modulating magnetic tape and optical discs
 Object storage device, computer storage device
 Portable storage device, small hard drive or pen drive
 Cloud storage service such as Google Drive, Dropbox and many more

See also